Many cell lines that are widely used for biomedical research have been overgrown by other, more aggressive cells. For example, supposed thyroid lines were actually melanoma cells, supposed prostate tissue was actually bladder cancer, and supposed normal uterine cultures were actually breast cancer. This is a list of cell lines that have been cross-contaminated and overgrown by other cells. Estimates based on screening of leukemia-lymphoma cell lines suggest that about 15% of these cell lines are not representative of what they are usually assumed to be. A project is currently underway to enumerate and rename contaminated cell lines to avoid errors in research caused by misattribution.

Contaminated cell lines have been extensively used in research without knowledge of their true character. For example, most if not all research on the endothelium ECV-304 or the megakaryocyte DAMI cell lines has in reality been conducted on bladder carcinoma and erythroleukemia cells, respectively. Thus, all research on endothelium- or megakaryocyte-specific functions utilizing these cell lines has turned out to be misguided, serving more of a warning example.

There are two principal ways a cell line can become contaminated: cell cultures are often exchanged between research groups; if, during handling, a sample gets contaminated and then passed on, subsequent exchanges of cells will lead to the contaminating population being established, although parts of the supposed cell line are still genuine. More serious is contamination at the source: during establishment of the original cell line, some contaminating cells are accidentally introduced into the cultures, where they in time outgrow the desired cells. The initial testing, in this case, still suggested that the cell line is genuine and novel, but in reality, it has disappeared soon after being established and all samples of such cell lines are actually the contaminant cells. It requires lengthy research to determine the precise point where cell lines have become contaminated. A mix-up rated as contamination could in reality be a simple confusion of two cell lines, but usually contamination is assumed.

After a cell line has been discovered to be contaminated, they are usually never used again for research demanding the specific type of cell line they are assumed to be. Most contaminated cell lines are discarded, however sometimes contaminant cells have acquired novel characteristics (e.g., by mutation or viral transfection, for example the HeLa derivate Det98) and thus constitute a novel lineage after all, so are not thrown away. If a cell line is thought to be contaminated, it is usually tested for authenticity. The widespread contamination of HeLa cells was initially recognized by Walter Nelson-Rees using simple Giemsa stain karyotyping under a light microscope. This technique works well in recognizing HeLa because these cells have distinctive chromosome aberrations. Novel cell lines are proliferated and distributed and/or deposited at a safekeeping institution such as the ATCC as soon as possible after establishment, to minimize the odds that the line becomes spoiled by contamination. It is considered good practice to periodically check cell lines maintained under laboratory conditions (i.e., not placed in long-term storage) for contamination with HeLa or other common contaminants, to ensure that their quality and integrity is maintained.

Lists of contaminated cell lines 

This list, containing 488 cell lines, was last updated on 1 December 2016.

Cellosaurus also is maintaining a list of "problematic" cell lines. The list is dynamically generated from all cell lines in the database with a comment containing the dedicated words "Problematic cell line". , the list contains 757 entries.

If no species is given in the individual entries of the following tables, the table's species applies to both the assumed and the actual cell types.

Cell lines marked Virtual in the table below are known instances of contamination at the source; these cell lines became extinct or never existed. Cases where non-contaminated lines are known or strongly suspected to exist are marked Existent.

Contaminated human cell lines

Contaminated non-human cell lines

Notes

References

Bibliography

External links 
 Cellosaurus list of problematics (contaminated/misidentified) cell lines

Cell culture
Cell lines
Medical lists